A mafia is an ethnic, family or culture-based organized crime enterprise.

Mafia usually refers specifically to:
 Sicilian Mafia, the original "Mafia", often referred to simply as "the Mafia"
 American Mafia, an Italian-American offshoot of the original Sicilian Mafia often referred to simply as "The Mafia" in the United States
 Ethnic Italian organized crime in general and organized crime in Italy

Entertainment

Film and television
 Mafia (1993 film), Malayalam film directed by Shaji Kailas
 Mafia (1996 film), Hindi-language film directed by Aziz Sejawal
 Mafia!, also known as Jane Austen's Mafia!, a 1998 American comedy film
 Mafia (2002 film), Egyptian film
 "Mafia" (The Office), the sixth episode of the sixth season of The Office

Games
 Mafia (social deduction game), also known as Werewolf
 Mafia (series), a series of video games by 2K Games
 Mafia (video game), 2002 video game
 Mafia II, 2010 video game
 Mafia III, 2016 video game
Mafia: Definitive Edition, 2020 video game
 Mafia Wars, a social network game

Music 
 La Mafia, a Tejano band
 Swedish House Mafia, a Swedish electronic dance music trio
 Lisa Maffia, British rapper
 B.U.G. Mafia, or simply Mafia, a Romanian rap group
 Mafia (B.U.G. Mafia album), 1995
 Mafia (Black Label Society album), 2005
 Mafia (Fleshgod Apocalypse EP), 2010
 "Mafia" (Jala Brat and Buba Corelli song), 2018
 "Mafia" (Travis Scott song), 2021

Groups and organizations
 Maffia, Czechoslovak secret organization acting during World War I.
 Berkeley Mafia, a group of Indonesian economists
 Bomber Mafia, a close-knit group of American military men who believed that long-range heavy bomber aircraft in large numbers were able to win a war
 Lesbian Sex Mafia, a New York City group for the support of alternative culture women
 Memphis Mafia, a group of associates of Elvis Presley from 1954 until he died
 Scottish mafia, a pejorative term for a group of Scottish politicians supposedly in control of the British government in the recent Labour administrations
 The Main Event Mafia (M.E.M.), a professional wrestling stable
 The E4 Mafia, a pejorative term used to refer to the informal fraternal network of junior enlisted soldiers in the United States Army holding the rank of Specialist

Other uses
 Gay Mafia, or Velvet Mafia, is a pejorative term for the amalgamation of gay rights groups in politics and the media
 Kiambu Mafia, people from Kenya's Kiambu District
 Mafia Island, part of Tanzania's Zanzibar Archipelago

See also 
 Mafic, a geological / mineralogical term